Tan Dabin (also Romanized as Tan Dabīn; also known as Nāvān-e Bālā and Tan Davīn) is a village in Kuhestani-ye Talesh Rural District, in the Central District of Talesh County, Gilan Province, Iran. At the 2006 census, its population was 141, in 28 families.

Language 
Linguistic composition of the village.

References 

Populated places in Talesh County

Azerbaijani settlements in Gilan Province